Josh Gardner (born September 4, 1982 in Freeport, Texas) is former American soccer player.

Career

College and amateur
Gardner played college soccer at the University of Cincinnati a starter as a freshman in 2001 to 2003. In 2002, was named second team All-Conference USA, he was tied for team lead with five assists. In 2003, Gardner led the team in points, tied for Bearcats' team lead with six goals and led the team with six assists.  Gardner earned All C-USA first team honors, second team All-Region after leading the Bearcats to the NCAA Tournament for only the second time in school history, and first team All-Ohio. He also played for the Houston Toros in the USL Premier Development League.

Professional
On the strength Gardner's single exceptional game for the United States U-20 national team in 2003, Gardner was offered a Project-40 contract before the 2004 season, which he signed. He was drafted 13th overall in the 2004 MLS SuperDraft by Los Angeles Galaxy, but saw very little playing time with the team, appearing in only two games, playing 25 minutes.

His stock rose prior to the 2006 season, as he turned in a strong performance in the CONCACAF Champions' Cup and started two of the first three games of the MLS season. Unfortunately, he soon fell out of favor with then-coach Steve Sampson and would not see much playing time until Sampson was fired and replaced by Frank Yallop. After Yallop's arrival, Gardner started every Galaxy game and was even mentioned as a replacement at left-back when the Galaxy traded Todd Dunivant. Gardner scored his first MLS goal on July 8, 2006, against Real Salt Lake. The Galaxy eventually released Gardner on March 23, 2007. During his three years with the Galaxy, Gardner played 1,096 minutes in 21 games and was a member of the Galaxy team that won both the MLS Cup and the Lamar Hunt U.S. Open Cup in 2005.

Gardner signed with the Seattle Sounders of the USL First Division in 2007, and quickly became their starting left midfielder, helping them win the USL1 Championship in his first year with the team.

When the USL Sounders were replaced by the MLS expansion team Seattle Sounders FC at the end of the 2008 season Gardner signed with the Carolina RailHawks in January 2009. He played 47 regular season games for Carolina over the next two seasons, helping them to a divisional title and the final of the USSF Division 2 Pro League playoffs in 2010.

Gardner made a return to Major League Soccer in 2011 when he signed with the Columbus Crew. He made his Black & Gold debut on February 22, 2011 in leg 1 of the Crew's CONCACAF Champions League quarter-final series against Real Salt Lake. On August 27, 2011, Gardner set an MLS record for fastest time between a goal and an own goal against the Seattle Sounders, scoring in the 73rd minute, and scoring an own goal in the 74th.

Gardner was left exposed by Columbus in the 2011 MLS Expansion Draft and was selected by expansion side Montreal Impact. He stayed with Montreal through the 2012 season, but the club announced in November 2012 that he would not return in 2013. His rights were traded to Sporting Kansas City in exchange for a second-round 2013 MLS SuperDraft pick.

Gardner was waived by Sporting on March 25, 2014.

International
In 2003 Gardner was invited to play in the US Soccer Festival with the United States U-20 national team. He assisted on the game's only goal.

Honors

Sporting Kansas City
MLS Cup: 2013

Los Angeles Galaxy
MLS Cup: 2005

Seattle Sounders
USL First Division Championship (1): 2007
USL First Division Commissioner's Cup (1): 2007

References

External links
 

1982 births
Living people
American soccer players
American expatriate soccer players
Association football defenders
Cincinnati Bearcats men's soccer players
Columbus Crew players
Expatriate soccer players in Canada
Houston Toros players
LA Galaxy draft picks
LA Galaxy players
Major League Soccer players
CF Montréal players
North Carolina FC players
People from Freeport, Texas
Seattle Sounders (1994–2008) players
Sporting Kansas City non-playing staff
Sporting Kansas City players
Sportspeople from the Houston metropolitan area
Soccer players from Texas
United States men's under-20 international soccer players
USL First Division players
USL League Two players
USSF Division 2 Professional League players